John Hack may refer to:

 John Hack (Medal of Honor) (1842–1933), soldier in the Union Army in the American Civil War
 John Hack (speedway rider) (born 1959), British motorcycle speedway rider 
 John Tilton Hack (1913–1991), American geologist
 John Barton Hack (1805–1884), early settler in South Australia